NGC 326 is a dumbbell galaxy in the constellation Pisces. It was discovered on August 24, 1865 by Heinrich d'Arrest. It was described by Dreyer as "faint, a little extended, 9th or 10th magnitude star to southeast."

Background
X-shaped (or "winged") radio galaxies are a class of extragalactic radio source that exhibit two, low-surface-brightness radio lobes (the "wings") oriented at an angle to the active, or high-surface-brightness, lobes. Both sets of lobes pass symmetrically through the center of the elliptical galaxy that is the source of the lobes, giving the radio galaxy an X-shaped morphology as seen on radio maps.

Study of the galaxy
NGC 326 is a radio galaxy; in fact, it is one of the most prominent X-shaped galaxies ever observed. Several studies have been conducted to try to explain its morphology through either fluid motion or reorientation of the jet axis. The Chandra X-ray Observatory examined the emissions of the galaxy. The study revealed several features, including a high-temperature front that might indicate a shock, high-temperate knots around the rim of the radio emission, and a cavity associated with the eastern wing.

References

External links

0326
18650824
Pisces (constellation)
Radio galaxies
Discoveries by Heinrich Louis d'Arrest
Elliptical galaxies